Michael Francis Maroney (1 November 1910 – 5 March 1972) was an Australian rules footballer who played with North Melbourne in the Victorian Football League (VFL).

Maroney was a leading sprinter in his youth, notably winning the Wangaratta Gift as an 18 year old in 1930.

He later served in the Australian Army during World War II.

Notes

External links 

1910 births
1972 deaths
Australian rules footballers from Victoria (Australia)
North Melbourne Football Club players
Australian Army personnel of World War II
Australian Army soldiers
People from Wangaratta
Military personnel from Victoria (Australia)